The John Field House, at 111 E. Fortune St. in Columbia, Kentucky, was built in 1812.  It was listed on the National Register of Historic Places in 1978.

It includes Federal architecture.

It was designed and/or built by James McDowell and Benjamin McDowell.

References

National Register of Historic Places in Adair County, Kentucky
Federal architecture in Kentucky
Houses completed in 1812
1812 establishments in Kentucky
Columbia, Kentucky